Born in the Delta is an album by blues pianist Pinetop Perkins, released on May 27, 1997. Perkins was 83 years old when he recorded the album in 1996, having begun his recording career late in life.

Musicians
Pinetop Perkins - piano, vocals
Tony O. - guitar (Anthony O. Melio is a member of Little Mike and the Tornadoes)
Jerry Portnoy - harmonica (on "Murmur Low")
Willie "Big Eyes" Smith - drums
Brad Vickers - bass

Track listing
"Everyday I Have the Blues" - Peter Chatman, Memphis Slim
"For You My Love" - Paul Gayten
"Look on Yonder Wall" - Elmore James
"Blues After Hours" - Robert Bruce, William Feyne, Avery Parrish
"Murmur Low" - Arthur Spires
"How Long, How Long Blues" - Leroy Carr, J. Mayo Williams
"Baby What You Want Me To Do" - Jimmy Reed
"Blues Oh Blues" - Anthony Melio

References

1997 albums
Pinetop Perkins albums
Telarc Records albums